Walden is a surname and a given name. 

People with the surname include:

 A.T. Walden (1885-1965), black American lawyer
 Aaron Walden (1835–1912), Polish Jewish Talmudist, editor, and author
 Brothers Alan (b. 1943) and Phil Walden (1940–2006), American music producers and managers, founders of Capricorn Records
 Alexander Walden (d. 1401), English MP
 Arthur Treadwell Walden (1871–1947), American polar adventurer and dog driver
 Ashley Walden (b. 1981 as Ashley Hayden), American luger
 Ben Walden (b. 1969), English actor
 Bengt Walden (b. 1973), Swedish-American luger
 Brian Walden (1932-2019), British journalist and broadcaster
 Bruno Walden (1911–1946), German Waffen-SS officer
 Celia Walden (b. 1975), British journalist, novelist and critic
 Chris Walden (b. 1966), German composer, arranger and conductor living in the U.S
 Christian de Walden (b. 1946), record producer, composer, arranger and songwriter of Italian origin
Corey Walden (born 1992), American professional basketball player, 2019 Israeli Basketball Premier League MVP
 Ebenezer Walden (1777–1857), American politician—Buffalo, New York
 Edwin Walden (1818-1889), American politician in Massachusetts
 Erik Walden (b. 1985), American football linebacker
 Frederick (Fanny) Walden (1888-1949) an English footballer, cricketer and cricket Test Match umpire
 Fred Walden (1890-1955), American baseball catcher
 Garth Walden (b. 1981), Australian race driver
 George Walden (b. 1939), British diplomat and politician
 Greg Walden (b. 1957), a United States politician
 Harold Walden (1887–1955), English Olympic amateur football player
 Harry Walden (b. 1940), English professional footballer
 Harvey Walden IV (b. 1966), United States Marine, drill instructor and television celebrity
 Herwarth Walden (1878–1941), a German art critic
 Hiram Walden (1800–1880), American politician, United States Representative from New York
 James "Jim" Walden (b. 1966), American lawyer and former federal prosecutor
 Jim "Jimmy" Walden (b. 1938), American football player and coach
 John Walden (disambiguation)
 John Morgan Walden (1831–1914), a bishop of the Methodist Episcopal Church
 Jordan Walden (b. 1987), American baseball pitcher
 Lionel Walden (1861–1933), American painter
 Louise Walden (b. 1983), British ice dancer
 Madison Miner Walden (1836-1891), American Civil War officer, teacher, publisher and farmer
 Mal Walden (b. 1945), Australian journalist and television news presenter
 Mark Walden (b. 1972), British writer
 Myron Walden (b. 1973), American jazz saxophonist and bass clarinettist
 Narada Michael Walden (b. 1952), American musician and producer
 Patrick Walden (b. 1978), a former guitarist of Babyshambles
 Paul Walden (1863–1957), a Riga-born German chemist
 Richard Walden (d. 2009), English professional footballer
 Ricky Walden (b. 1982), English snooker professional
 Robert Walden (disambiguation)
 Roger Walden (d. 1406), an English treasurer and church figure
 Ron Walden (1907–1985), Australian rugby union player
 Rudolf Walden (1878–1946), a Finnish independence man, industrialist and a general, Minister of War during World War II
 Saskia Walden (b.1974), Suriname accountant and politician
 Stefan de Walden (1896-1976), Polish military commander and engineer
 Susan Walden, American actress
 Tsvia Walden (צביה ולדן; b. 1946), Israeli psycholinguist and academic
 William Walden (disambiguation)
 W. Elliott Walden (1963), American horse trainer and racing executive
 Arthur Hay, 9th Marquess of Tweeddale (Viscount Walden, 1824–1878), a Scottish soldier and ornithologist

People with the given name include:
 Walden L. Ainsworth (1886–1960), admiral of the United States Navy
 Walden Bello (b. 1945), Filipino author, academic and political analyst
 Bobby Darin (b. Walden Robert Cassotto) (1936–1973), American singer, songwriter, multi-instrumentalist and actor 
 Walden Erickson (1902–1968), American professional football player
 Walden Martin (1891–1966), American Olympic road racing cyclist
 Walden O'Dell, American financial executive
 Walden Alexis Vargas (b. 1984), Colombian football player

Fictional characters include:
 Walden Belfiore, fictional character from the HBO series The Sopranos, played by Frank John Hughes
 Walden Schmidt, fictional character in the CBS sitcom Two and a Half Men, portrayed by Ashton Kutcher

See also
 Waldon

English masculine given names
English-language surnames